Pete "La Roca" Sims (born Peter Sims; April 7, 1938 – November 20, 2012, known as Pete La Roca from 1957 until 1968) was an American jazz drummer and attorney. Born and raised in Harlem by a pianist mother and a stepfather who played trumpet, he was introduced to jazz by his uncle Kenneth Bright, a major shareholder in Circle Records and the manager of rehearsal spaces above the Lafayette Theater. Sims studied percussion at the High School of Music and Art and at the City College of New York, where he played tympani in the CCNY Orchestra. He adopted the name La Roca early in his musical career, when he played timbales for six years in Latin bands. In the 1970s, during a hiatus from jazz performance, he resumed using his original surname. When he returned to jazz in the late 1970s, he usually inserted "La Roca" into his name in quotation marks to help audiences familiar with his early work identify him. He told The New York Times in 1982 that he did so only out of necessity:

In 1957, Max Roach became aware of him while jamming at Birdland and recommended him to Sonny Rollins. As drummer of Rollins' trio on the afternoon set at the Village Vanguard on November 3 he became part of the important record A Night at the Village Vanguard. (Only one of five recorded tracks with La Roca was included on the original single LP release of the album). In 1959 he recorded with Jackie McLean (New Soil) and in a quartet with Tony Scott, Bill Evans and Jimmy Garrison. Besides Garrison he often joined with bassists who played in the Bill Evans Trio, especially Scott LaFaro and Steve Swallow, and also accompanied pianists like Steve Kuhn, Don Friedman and Paul Bley.

Between the end of the 1950s and 1968, he also played with Slide Hampton, the John Coltrane Quartet, Marian McPartland, Art Farmer, Freddie Hubbard, Mose Allison, and Charles Lloyd, among others. During this period, he led  his own group and worked as the house drummer at the Jazz Workshop in Boston, Massachusetts. He recorded two albums as a leader during the mid-1960s, Basra (Blue Note, 1965) and Turkish Women at the Bath (Douglas, 1967).

In 1968, with the market for acoustic jazz in decline, Sims decided to enroll in law school. By this time he was already earning most of his income by driving a taxi cab in New York City, a job he held for five years during the 1960s. Sims became a lawyer in the early 1970s, and was still practicing at the time of a 1997 radio interview with WNYC's Steve Sullivan. When his second album as leader, Turkish Women at the Bath, was released under Chick Corea's name without his consent, Sims filed and argued a lawsuit against Douglas Records, and the erroneously-labeled records were recalled.

He returned to jazz part-time in 1979, and recorded one new album as a leader, Swing Time (Blue Note, 1997).

He died in New York of lung cancer at the age of 74.

Discography

As leader
 Basra (Blue Note, 1965)
 Turkish Women at the Bath (Douglas, 1967; also released as Bliss! under Chick Corea's name on Muse, 1973)
 Swingtime (Blue Note, 1997)

As sideman
With Anamari
Anamari (Atlantic, 1964)
With Bill Barron
Modern Windows (Savoy, 1961)
With Paul Bley
 Footloose! (Savoy, 1963)
With Rocky Boyd
 Ease It (Jazztime, 1961)
With Jaki Byard
 Hi-Fly (New Jazz, 1962)
With Sonny Clark
 My Conception (rec. 1957, Blue Note compilation, 1979)
 Sonny Clark Quintets a.k.a.  Cool Struttin' Volume 2 (rec. 1958, Blue Note, 1965)
With Johnny Coles
 Little Johnny C (Blue Note, 1963)
With Ted Curson
 Plenty of Horn (Old Town, 1961)
With Art Farmer
 To Sweden with Love (Atlantic, 1964) with Jim Hall
 Sing Me Softly of the Blues (Atlantic, 1965)
With the Don Friedman Trio
 Circle Waltz (Riverside, 1962) with Scott LaFaro
 Scott LaFaro – Pieces of Jade (rec. 1961, Resonance, 2009)
With Slide Hampton
 Slide Hampton and His Horn of Plenty (Strand, 1959)
 Sister Salvation (Atlantic, 1960)
 Somethin' Sanctified (Atlantic, 1961)
With Joe Henderson
 Page One (Blue Note, 1963)
 Our Thing (Blue Note, 1963)
With Freddie Hubbard
 Blue Spirits (Blue Note, 1964)
 The Night of the Cookers (Blue Note, 1965)
With the Steve Kuhn Trio
 1960 (rec. 1960, PJL (J), 2005) with Scott LaFaro
 The Country and Western Sound of Jazz Pianos (Dauntless, 1963) with Toshiko Akiyoshi
 Three Waves (rec. 1966, Flying Dutchman (J), 1975) with Steve Swallow
 Sing Me Softly of the Blues (Venus, 1997) with George Mraz
With Booker Little
 Booker Little and Friend (Bethlehem, 1961)
With Charles Lloyd
 Of Course, of Course (Columbia, 1965)
 Nirvana (Columbia, 1965)
 Charles Lloyd - Live at Slugs' (Resonance, 2014)
With Jackie McLean
 New Soil (Blue Note, 1959)
 Bluesnik (Blue Note, 1961)
With Helen Merrill and Dick Katz
 The Feeling Is Mutual  (Milestone, 1967)
With J.R. Monterose
 The Message (Jaro, 1960)
With Sonny Rollins
 A Night at the Village Vanguard (Blue Note, 1957)
 St Thomas – Sonny Rollins Trio in Stockholm 1959 (Dragon, 1984)
 Oleo (recorded 1959, Jazz Hour, 1992)
With George Russell
 The Outer View (Riverside, 1962)
With Tony Scott
 Gypsy (Signature, 1959)
 Golden Moments (recorded 1959, Muse, 1982) with Bill Evans and Jimmy Garrison
 I'll Remember (recorded 1959, Muse, 1982); both Muse LPs reissued on CD as At Last (32 Jazz, 1999)
With the Paul Serrano Quintet
 Blues Holiday (Riverside, 1961) with Cannonball Adderley a.o.

References

External links
Pete LaRoca Sims Discography at JazzDiscography.com

1938 births
2012 deaths
African-American drummers
American jazz drummers
Blue Note Records artists
Muse Records artists
20th-century African-American people
21st-century African-American people